The Rosa Parks Transit Center is the main local bus station in Detroit, Michigan serving as the central hub for the Detroit Department of Transportation (DDOT) bus system.  The station was built on the site of Times Square in the west end of Downtown Detroit.

Description
The three-story, 25,700 square foot structure includes space for restrooms, an indoor waiting area, retail space, transit police offices, and a Detroit Police Department mini-station.  The most distinguishing feature of the transit center is its soaring tensile canopy.  The transit center building was designed by Parsons Brinckerhoff, and the canopy by FTL Design Engineering Studio of Detroit.

Besides acting as the central hub of DDOT, the station is a stop on many SMART routes which connect the city to its suburbs, the Transit Windsor Tunnel Bus, a commuter and special bus service connecting the downtowns of Detroit and Windsor, and a stop for Megabus.  The Detroit People Mover's Times Square station and Michigan Avenue station are across the street from the transit center.

History
Announced in 2005, the project was developed by the Detroit Economic Growth Corporation. It began construction in 2007 and was opened for service in July 2009 at a total cost of $22.5 million.

References

External links

Bus stations in Michigan
Transportation buildings and structures in Detroit
Memorials to Rosa Parks